Killdeer Mountains is a mountain range in Dunn County, North Dakota, in the United States.

The range's name comes from the Native Americans, who used the area as a hunting ground for deer. The range was the scene of the Battle of Killdeer Mountain in 1864.

References

Landforms of Dunn County, North Dakota
Mountains of North Dakota